Saidi Tama Nduwimana (born 6 June 1989) is a Burundian professional footballer, who plays as a goalkeeper for AS Inter Star in the Burundi Football League.

International career
He made his international debut for Burundi in 2011. He was invited by Lofty Naseem, the national team coach, to represent Burundi in the 2014 African Nations Championship held in South Africa.

References

Living people
Association football goalkeepers
Burundian footballers
Burundi international footballers
Burundian expatriate footballers
2014 African Nations Championship players
Burundi A' international footballers
1989 births
21st-century Burundian people